Abana (Native land) was a first ever Sindhi movie, it was released in 1958. it was directed by Arjun Hingorani and Dharam Kumar.

Cast
Sheila Ramani, Kaan Mohan, Sadhana were cast of this movie.

Plot

References

Sindhi-language films
1958 films
Indian black-and-white films